Heije Schaper (8 September 1906 – 26 May 1996) was a Dutch naval and air force officer and lieutenant general of the Royal Netherlands Air Force.

Schaper a highly decorated World War II officer was awarded the Military Order of William, the highest honour of the Netherlands on 15 November 1940. Schaper served in the Royal Netherlands Navy and later the Royal Netherlands Air Force. He was the Commander of the Royal Netherlands Air Force from 1 May 1956 until 1 September 1961 and the Chairman of the United Defence Staff of the Armed Forces of the Netherlands (highest-ranking military officer) from 1 November 1957 until 10 May 1959. He retired from active service in 1961 and served as State Secretary for Defence, tasked with Air Force affairs from 22 June 1966 until 5 April 1967.

Decorations

References

External links

Official
  H. (Heije) Schaper Parlement & Politiek

1906 births
1996 deaths
Aide-de-camp to the Monarch of the Netherlands
Commanders of the Order of the Netherlands Lion
Commanders of the Royal Netherlands Air Force
Dutch aviators
Dutch prisoners of war in World War II
Engelandvaarders
Grand Officers of the Order of Orange-Nassau
Independent politicians in the Netherlands
Knights Fourth Class of the Military Order of William
Recipients of the Distinguished Flying Cross (United Kingdom)
Royal Netherlands Air Force generals
Royal Netherlands Air Force officers
Royal Netherlands Air Force personnel of World War II
Royal Netherlands Air Force pilots
Royal Netherlands Navy admirals
Royal Netherlands Naval College alumni
Royal Netherlands Navy officers
Royal Netherlands Navy personnel of World War II
Royal Netherlands Navy pilots
Shot-down aviators
Stalag Luft III prisoners of World War II
State Secretaries for Defence of the Netherlands
Submariners
People from Skarsterlân
Military personnel from The Hague
World War II prisoners of war held by Germany
20th-century Dutch military personnel
20th-century Dutch politicians